The Hobbesian trap (or Schelling's dilemma) is a theory that explains why preemptive strikes occur between two groups, out of bilateral fear of an imminent attack. Without outside influences this situation will lead to a fear spiral (catch-22, vicious circle, Nash equilibrium) in which fear will lead to an arms race which in turn will lead to increasing fear. The Hobbesian trap can be explained in terms of game theory. Although cooperation would be the better outcome for both sides, mutual distrust leads to the adoption of strategies that have negative outcomes for both individual players and all players combined. The theory has been used to explain outbreaks of conflicts and violence, spanning from individuals to states.

History
The first example of a Hobbesian trap reasoning is Thucydides's analysis of the Peloponnesian War. Thucydides presented that fear and distrust towards the other side led to an escalation of violence. The theory is most commonly associated with Thomas Hobbes. Thomas Schelling also saw fear as a motive for conflict. Applying game theory to the Cold War conflict and the US nuclear strategy, Schelling's view was that in situations where two parties are in conflict but share a common interest, the two sides will often reach a tacit agreement rather than resort to open conflict.

Examples
Steven Pinker is a proponent of the theory of the Hobbesian trap and has applied the theory to many conflicts and outbreaks of violence between people, groups, tribes, societies and states. Issues of gun control have been described as a Hobbesian trap. A common example is the dilemma that both the armed burglar and the armed homeowner face when they meet each other. Neither side may want to shoot, but both are afraid of the other party shooting first so they may be inclined to fire pre-emptively, although the favorable outcome for both parties would be that nobody be shot. 

A similar example between two states is the Cuban Missile Crisis. Fear and mutual distrust between the actors increased the likelihood of a preemptive strike. Hobbesian traps in nuclear weapons' case can be defused if both sides can threaten second strike, which is the capacity to retaliate with nuclear force after the first attack. This is the basis of Mutual assured destruction.

A form of the Hobbesian trap has been used to answer the Fermi Paradox by arguing that any two advanced space-faring civilizations will inevitably seek to destroy each other rather than risk being destroyed.

Avoidance
The Hobbesian trap can be avoided by influences that increase the trust between the two parties. In Hobbes' case, the hobbesian trap would be present in the state of nature where, in the absence of law and law enforcement, the credible threat of violence from others may justify pre-emptive attacks. For Hobbes, we avoid this problem by naming a ruler who pledges to punish violence with violence. In the Cuban Missile Crisis, for example, Kennedy and Khrushchev realized that they were caught in a Hobbesian trap which helped them to make concessions that reduced distrust and fear.

See also

 Hobson's choice
 Mutually assured destruction
 Preemptive war
 Presumption of guilt 
 Prisoner's dilemma
 Security dilemma
 Realism (international relations)

References

Further reading

External links
 German wiktionary
 The Hobbesian Trap Research Gate

Aggression
Conflict (process)
Game theory
Dilemmas
Social concepts